Haplochromis mylodon is a species of cichlid found in the Democratic Republic of the Congo and Uganda where it occurs in the Kazinga Channel, Lake George and Lake Edward.  This species can reach a length of  SL.

References

mylodon
Fish described in 1973
Cichlid fish of Africa
Taxonomy articles created by Polbot